The archery competition at the 2022 World Games took place in July 2022, in Birmingham in United States, at the Avondale Park Historic District. Originally scheduled to take place in July 2021, the Games were rescheduled for July 2022 as a result of the 2020 Summer Olympics postponement due to the COVID-19 pandemic.

Qualification

Participating nations

Medal table

Medalists

Men

Women

Mixed

References

External links
 World Archery
 Archery on IWGA website
 Results book

 
2022 World Games
World Games
2022
International archery competitions hosted by the United States